Face the Music: The EP (also known as Face the Music) is the title of the second extended play released by Canadian pop-rock group Marianas Trench. Featuring popular songs from the group's most recent album, Ever After (2011), the EP marks Marianas Trench's first official US music release. It was first released May 10, 2013 in New Zealand before being released in North America later that month, and was distributed through 604 Records, Cherrytree Records, and Interscope Records.

Critical reception
Alter the Press! rated the EP 3.5 stars out of 5, with reviewer Cara Friedman writing that the record is "worth it just for the two acoustic versions," as they are "the most unique" and a possibly-unexpected change of pace from the pop and electronic influences of their studio recordings. Allison Sternall of Confront Magazine was also positive, giving the EP a 4/5 rating. She noted that the tracks chosen "showcase [the band's] ability to create a great radio hit," but also felt the record could have benefited from the inclusion of a slower ballad to give listeners a "better-rounded introduction to the band's music as a whole."

Track listing

Chart performance

Release history

References

2013 EPs
Marianas Trench (band) EPs
604 Records albums
Cherrytree Records albums
Interscope Records EPs